Justice Hunt may refer to:

Ward Hunt, associate justice of the U.S. Supreme Court
Albert C. Hunt, associate justice of the Oklahoma Supreme Court
John Hunt (Michigan judge), associate justice of the Michigan Supreme Court
William Henry Hunt (judge), associate justice of the Montana Supreme Court
William E. Hunt, associate justice of the Montana Supreme Court
Willis B. Hunt Jr., associate justice of the Georgia Supreme Court